Roland Green may refer to:

Roland Green (Australian politician) (1885–1947)
Roland Green (cyclist) (born 1974), Canadian mountain bike and road bicycle racer
Roland Green (painter) (1896-1972), English bird painter and illustrator
Roland J. Green (born 1944), American science fiction and fantasy writer